Niklas Appelgren (born June 24, 1990) is a Finnish professional ice hockey winger who currently plays for Ässät of Liiga.

Appelgren previously played in Mestis for KooKoo and Hermes before making his Liiga debut for Sport during the 2016–17 season, playing two games during a loan spell from Hermes.

On April 13, 2017, Appelgren signed for Ässät.

References

External links

1990 births
Living people
Ässät players
Finnish ice hockey forwards
Kokkolan Hermes players
KooKoo players
Imatran Ketterä players
People from Kouvola
Vaasan Sport players
Sportspeople from Kymenlaakso